Blue Labour: Forging a New Politics is a 2015 book edited by Maurice Glasman, Baron Glasman. The collection of chapters by different contributors attempts to further articulate the Blue Labour political tendency within the Labour Party and British politics more generally, building on previous books such as The Labour Tradition and the Politics of Paradox: The Oxford London Seminars, 2010–2011 and Tangled Up in Blue. In his foreword, Rowan Williams states that whilst contemporary academic thought is increasingly questioning the idea of a "solitary, speechless individual" with utilitarian aims as a theoretical starting-point, this has not been accompanied by an associated shift in public rhetoric and popular imagination. He expresses his belief that if people are to change politics in a positive manner, especially in light of the recent financial crisis, we must develop new communitarian approaches that start from civil society upwards. The remainder of the book is accordingly a development of this basic notion, arranged thematically.

Synopsis

Introduction
Adrian Pabst from the outset situates Blue Labour in opposition to the wider framework of social and economic liberalisation, and the categories of secular left and reactionary right, that have characterised the postwar settlement in British politics. Continuity is instead claimed to be found with the British Romantic tradition embodied by William Morris, with its "emphasis on the creativity of human labour, on the intrinsic importance of vocation and on the need to nurture virtuous action". Pabst proclaims the timeless values of the common good, participation, association, individual virtue and public honour as comprising Blue Labour's core beliefs.

Part One: Narrative and Programme
Part One begins with Maurice Glasman adumbrating his ideas on the foundations of a good society, taking particular influence from Catholic Social Teaching. He points to Germany's postwar model of development, characterised by subsidiarity and decentralisation, and corporatism rather than class conflict, as a set of ideas from which influences can be drawn. He views this as being able to overcome the dichotomy between the two impersonal entities of state and market, both of which he sees as having damaged social cohesion. John Milbank then goes on to expose what he sees as the limits of contemporary liberalism in both its left-wing and right-wing incarnations, arguing that it promotes a contractual, self-interested worldview that ignored meaningful, reciprocal relations in favour of an increasing commodification of human existence. This is followed by a contribution by Frank Field, who charts the loss of the Labour Party's core working-class constituency. He identifies a lack of patriotism and a disconnect between both rights and privileges as well as contributions and entitlements as being particularly problematic.

Part Two: Labour - Party and Politics
David Lammy opens the section with a reflection on his own experiences in growing up and joining the Labour Party, arguing that Blue Labour is itself reflective of the spirit of the party he had joined as a young man. He welcomes Blue Labour's ability to engage in dialogue with other factions in forming the basis of Labour in the future. Arnie Graf then goes on to speak of his experiences with community organising in the United States and how this is suited to Blue Labour's own perspective. Leading on from this is a chapter by Tom Watson focusing on trade unionism. Watson speaks positively of the historical role of trade unions in the United Kingdom, and issues a call for a more relational approach to trade union organisation, both internally between members and the leadership as well as externally between workers and management.

Part Three: Political Economy
Established Blue Labour spokesman Jon Cruddas begins Part Three with a reflection on liberal political economy's atomistic character, in contrast to faith-based moral systems. The latter would be reflected, he believes, in a politico-economic model “which combines private profit with public benefit by sharing reward, risk and responsibility amongst all stakeholders”. The state's role would also have to be altered, with greater decentralisation for local communities, no more outsourcing of services to the private sector, and no more top-down reorganisation. Adrian Pabst builds on these points, proposing a ‘civil economy’ that “ties economic profit to ethical and social purpose” and seeking to “ethicise exchange by instituting just prices, fair wages and non-usurious rates of interest”. This must replace the current ‘broken’ UK political economy, characterised by low wages, low productivity, low innovation, low growth, and high inequality. ‘Virtue’ must be at the heart of this conception. David Goodhart takes on the next chapter's topic of immigration. ‘Immigrationist ideology’, he argues, has co-opted left-wingers onto the side of big business. Mass immigration has brought with it, he argues, social dislocation, and whilst lauded as good for the economy it has seen lower wages and a lack of employment for Britons who instead languish on unemployment assistance.

Part Four: Alternative Modernity – On Nature, Progress and Work
Political Director of Greenpeace UK, Ruth Davis, opens the section by bemoaning the false dichotomy between science and faith characteristic of the contemporary era. Scientific knowledge, she argues, must be applied within the context of tradition, meaning, value and virtue; it is only through this basic approach that Labour's environmentalist characteristics can be revived. Dave Landrum adds his contribution, analysing how the broad notion of ‘progress’ has distorted political discussion, through the assumption that achievements are cumulative rather than recurrent. This has led to a variety of perverse results, whether Tony Blair and his embrace of individualistic ethics, or the Marxist position in which traditional wisdom is a barrier to enlightenment. Ruth Yeoman, for the 12th chapter, speaks of the need for meaningful work and workplace interactions, which although a dominant part of most peoples’ lives is neglected to be seen as anything other than a means to an end rather than an end in itself.

Part Five: Labour’s Radical ‘Conservatism’
Rowenna Davis, another veteran Blue Labour contributor, lauds the British peoples’ inherent conservative desires for order, strength, stability and community, which has been ignored by the ‘modernising’ liberal forces of the political establishment. The concessions made to the free market and finance capital, Davis argues, have been antithetical to true small-c conservative values. Ed West elaborates this line of thought more explicitly, noting the negative consequences of the otherwise-noble New Left commitment to the rights of women and sexual and racial minorities. West sees results of this progressivism as including familial breakdown, social fragmentation due to mass immigration, and the elimination of a commitment to socialism.

Part Six: Faith and Family
Luke Bretherton begins by asserting that Blue Labour is rooted not in abstract theory but in the practice of everyday politics: "on already established practices, traditions and customs, and the presuppositions and histories that inform them." He calls for recognising institutions such as schools, universities, small businesses and hospitals, as important bastions of common life against the tide of globalising commodification. That is a practical politics based on common work, distinct from the instant demands of recognition and respect seen in identity politics. Michael Merrick then writes on how Labour and the left have neglected the family in spite of the clear evidence that stable families are overwhelmingly positive for a child's development. Liberal individualist attitudes saw the replacement of familial positions with economic ones and led to the state faultily attempting to compensate for the gaps in between. Marriage began to be seen as an increasingly as a simple two-party contract of individual happiness.

Conclusion: Blue Labour – Principles, Policy Ideas and Prospects
Adrian Pabst reiterates the necessity of Blue Labour in relocating virtue, value and vocation in British politics. This will be achieved, as the book has shown, through policies of self-government, reciprocity, welfare reform, the revitalisation of the workplace (including a living wage), fair prices for everyday costs and an overhaul of finance. Through the recognition of these key ‘post-liberal’ ideas, Labour will be able to tell a story of national renewal, win over disillusioned voters, and transform the country.

Reception
The book has received positive reviews from several commentators. These include journalists Rafael Behr from The Guardian, Rod Liddle from The Spectator and Peter Oborne from The Telegraph, as well as academics such as Robert Skidelsky, Market Garnett, Philip Blond and Colin Crouch.

References

Blue Labour
Books about politics of the United Kingdom
2015 non-fiction books
I.B. Tauris books